The IMOCA 60 Class yacht Paprec-Virbac 3 was designed in partnership with VPLP and Guillaume Verdier and launched on 18 May 2010 after being built by Cookson Boats in New Zealand. The boat was lost during the 2016 Vendee Globe where the skipper was rescued and in November 2018 the remains of written of yacht were found on the east coast of Madagascar.

Racing results

References 

Individual sailing yachts
2000s sailing yachts
Sailing yachts designed by VPLP
Sailboat type designs by Guillaume Verdier
Vendée Globe boats
IMOCA 60
Sailboat types built in New Zealand